Agate is a populated place in Ontonagon County, Michigan. The community is on Michigan highway-28 approximately ten miles west of Kenton and seven miles southeast of Bruce Crossing.

References

Unincorporated communities in Ontonagon County, Michigan
Unincorporated communities in Michigan